Neodiplotoxa is a genus of flies in the family Chloropidae.

Species

Neodiplotoxa pulchripes (Loew, 1872)
Neodiplotoxa nigricans (Loew, 1872)
Neodiplotoxa mexicana (Duda, 1930)
Neodiplotoxa albiseta (Becker, 1912)

References

Chloropidae genera